Lawrence Sail (born 29 October 1942) is a contemporary British poet and writer.

Biography
Sail was born in London and brought up in Exeter. He studied French and German at Oxford University and subsequently taught for some years in Kenya, before returning to the UK, where he taught at Blundell's School and, later, Exeter School (where the modern languages department was headed by Harry Guest, another published poet). He is now a freelance writer.

Sail has published nine poetry collections, the most recent being Eye-Baby (2006); The World Returning (2002), Building into Air (1995), and Out of Land: New and Selected Poems (1992), and has edited a number of anthologies, including The New Exeter Book of Riddles (1999) with Kevin Crossley-Holland, and First and Always: Poems for Great Ormond Street Children’s Hospital (1988). He also edited South-West Review from 1980 to 1985.

Sail works in schools and colleges, and has also written a radio play, as well as short features for radio. He has presented the BBC Radio 3 programme 'Poetry Now' and 'Time for Verse' on BBC Radio 4.

He was chairman of the Arvon Foundation from 1990 to 1994, has directed the Cheltenham Literature Festival, was the UK jury member for the European Literature Prize (1994–96), has been a judge for the Whitbread Prize and is a Fellow of the Royal Society of Literature.

Bibliography
Opposite Views   Dent, 1974
The Drowned River   Mandeville Press, 1978
The Kingdom of Atlas   Secker & Warburg, 1980
South-West Review: A Celebration   (editor)   South West Arts, 1985
Devotions   Secker & Warburg, 1987
Aquamarine  The Gruffyground Press, 1988
First and Always: Poems for Great Ormond Street Children's Hospital   (compiler and editor)   Faber and Faber, 1988
Water (Poem Poster)   (wood-engraving by Hellmuth Weissenborn)   Friends of Cheltenham Literature Festival, 1989
Air (Poem Poster)   (wood-engraving by John O'Connor)   Friends of Cheltenham Literature Festival, 1990
Fire (Poem Poster)   (wood-engraving by Gwenda Morgan)   Friends of Cheltenham Literature Festival, 1991
Earth (Poem Poster)   (wood-engraving by Miriam MacGregor)   Friends of Cheltenham Literature Festival, 1992
Out of Land: New and Selected Poems Bloodaxe Books, 1992
Building into Air Bloodaxe Books, 1995
The New Exeter Book of Riddles   (edited with Kevin Crossley-Holland; illustrated by Simon Drew)   Enitharmon, 1999
The World Returning Bloodaxe Books, 2002
Cross-currents   (essays)   Enitharmon, 2005
Light Unlocked: Christmas Card Poems   (edited with Kevin Crossley-Holland; illustrated by John Lawrence)   Enitharmon, 2005
Eye-Baby Bloodaxe Books, 2006
Waking Dreams: New & Selected Poems Bloodaxe Books, 2010

Prizes and awards
1992   Hawthornden Fellowship
1993   Arts Council Writers' Award
2004   Cholmondeley Award

References

Extracted from The Open Library
Lawrence Sail at Contemporary Writers

1942 births
Writers from Exeter
Fellows of the Royal Society of Literature
Living people
English male poets